Shyroke Raion was a raion (district) of Dnipropetrovsk Oblast, southeastern-central Ukraine. Its administrative centre was located at the urban-type settlement of Shyroke. The raion was abolished on 18 July 2020 as part of the administrative reform of Ukraine, which reduced the number of raions of Dnipropetrovsk Oblast to seven. The area of Shyroke Raion was merged into Kryvyi Rih Raion.

At the time of disestablishment, the raion consisted of four hromadas:
 Hrechani Pody rural hromada with the administration in the selo of Hrechani Pody;
 Karpivka rural hromada with the administration in the selo of Karpivka;
 Novolativka rural hromada with the administration in the selo of Novolativka;
 Shyroke settlement hromada with the administration in Shyroke.

References

Former raions of Dnipropetrovsk Oblast
1923 establishments in Ukraine
Ukrainian raions abolished during the 2020 administrative reform